Blackwell railway station was a railway station serving  Blackwell in the English county of Worcestershire.

History
It was opened by the Birmingham and Gloucester Railway in 1841 a year after the line opened. In 1846, it became part of the Midland Railway which had been formed two years before.

It was situated at the top and northern end of the steepest part of the Lickey Incline and, slightly to the north were the sidings where the banking engines would drop back from their trains and reverse ready to return to Bromsgrove. In addition, trains travelling southwards (downhill) would be brought to a stand at the head of the incline for a brake test including, until 1941, passenger trains. In the days before through braking of goods trains, wagon brakes would have to be pinned down. Even later, when vacuum braking had been introduced, most trains would only be partly fitted and, often, a banking engine would have to lead the train to provide extra braking.

There were two platforms, that on the down (southward) line being exceedingly long - much longer than that on the upside.  Access to it was by a barrow crossing to the south, there being no footbridge.  There were short goods sidings for each line running into bay platforms, with an extra one on the upside. The entrance and booking hall was on the up platform, with a small waiting room on the other side. Construction was of typical Midland Railway brick built design with wooden awnings.

At grouping in 1923 it became part of the London Midland and Scottish Railway. The station closed in 1966. Although a few railway cottages still exist, the station itself has disappeared.

Stationmasters

William Buckingham ca. 1845 - 1877 
Thomas Clay 1877 - 1881 (afterwards station master at Croxall)
G. Freeman 1881 - 1884 (afterwards station master at Fish Ponds)
Richard Foskett 1884 - 1889 (formerly station master at Monsal Dale, afterwards station master at Borrowash)
John V. Hawkins 1889 - 1898 (formerly station master at Sawley, afterwards station master at Sharnbrook)
Charles Roughton 1898 - 1901 (formerly station master at Church Road, Birmingham)
J.A.E Rainbow 1901 - 1905 (formerly station master at Shustoke)
John Benjamin Tuffley 1905 - 1911  (afterwards station master at Alcester) 
Charles Henry Shill 1911 - ca. 1924 (formerly station master at Cam and Dursley)
H.L. George from 1939
Charles Harper 1947 - 1965

References

External links
 http://www.railaroundbirmingham.co.uk/Stations/blackwell.php

Railway stations in Great Britain opened in 1841
Railway stations in Great Britain closed in 1966
Disused railway stations in Worcestershire
Former Midland Railway stations
Beeching closures in England